Santa Cecilia is an early painting by the baroque painter Artemisia Gentileschi, a painter described as "a grand exception in the history of art - a successful woman painter in an era in which art was dominated by men."

Description
It shows a woman in a yellow gown and white chemise playing a lute, with an organ in the background. A cleaning in 1988 made the organ visible and confirmed the depiction of Saint Cecelia an early Christian martyr who later became associated with musical instruments.

Provenance
It is believed to have been painted in 1620 and is known to be in the collection Alessandro Biffi by 1637. It passed to the Spada collection in the seventeenth century as a means of settling debts and is currently in the Galleria Spada in Rome. In 1759 it was inventoried as "school of Titian", then later ascribed to Caravaggio and Caroselli, before being suggested as a work of Artemisia in 1911.

References

Sources 

Paintings by Artemisia Gentileschi
1620s paintings
Musical instruments in art
Paintings in the Galleria Spada